The 2009 VIVA World Cup was the third VIVA World Cup, an international tournament for football open to non-FIFA-affiliated teams, played in Padania.

Three venues were bidding to host the tournament in 2010 :
  Padania ( Italy)
  Iraqi Kurdistan ( Iraq)
  Gozo ( Malta)

At the NF-Board general meeting in Milan (Italy), on 13 December 2008, it was decided to hold the Viva World Cup annually. The 2010 edition will be played in Gozo and priority was given to Iraqi Kurdistan to host the 2011 tournament.

Occitania originally finished 5th, but having made one more substitution than allowed, the result was overturned, leaving Gozo as the winners of the 5th place playoff.

The defending champions from the previous tournament were Padania, who went on to win the tournament.

Participating teams

Squads
For a list of all squads that appeared in the final tournament, see 2009 VIVA World Cup squads.

Venues

Group stage

Group A

Group B

Knockout stage

Semi-finals

5th-place match

3rd-place match

Final

Goalscorers

5 goals
  Svein Thomassen
  Enais Hammoud
4 goals
  Karzan Abdullah

See also
ELF Cup
UNPO Cup
FIFI Wild Cup
KTFF 50th Anniversary Cup
Nouvelle Fédération-Board

External links
VIVA Official Site
Teams line-up and Schedule 
Line-ups 2009_VIVA_World_Cup

References

2009
2009 in association football
2009